Maurizio Leone (born Cosenza, 17 August 1973) is a former Italian male long-distance runner who competed at four editions of the IAAF World Cross Country Championships at senior level (1995, 2001, 2003, 2005). He won two national championships at senior level (cross country running: 2005).

References

External links
 
 Maurizio Leone profile at Association of Road Racing Statisticians

1973 births
Living people
Italian male long-distance runners
Italian male cross country runners
Universiade bronze medalists for Italy
Universiade medalists in athletics (track and field)
Athletics competitors of Centro Sportivo Carabinieri
Medalists at the 1995 Summer Universiade